1979 Emmy Awards may refer to:

 31st Primetime Emmy Awards, the 1979 Emmy Awards ceremony honoring primetime programming
 6th Daytime Emmy Awards, the 1979 Emmy Awards ceremony honoring daytime programming
 7th International Emmy Awards, the 1979 Emmy Awards ceremony honoring international programming

Emmy Award ceremonies by year